Gaius Octavius Laenas was a Roman senator, who was active during the Principate. He was suffect consul in the second half of AD 33 as the colleague of Lucius Salvius Otho. Laenas was also curator aquarum, or overseer of the aqueducts and water supply of Rome from the death of Marcus Cocceius Nerva from about the year 33 to the year 38.

Octavius Laenas is important for genealogical reasons, as Ronald Syme explains. He was the son of another Octavius Laenas, who is otherwise unattested, and Sergia "presumed a daughter of the patrician L. Sergius Plautus". Besides the future consul, the elder Laenas and Sergia also had a daughter, Sergia Plautilla, who married Marcus Cocceius Nerva; their children included the future emperor Nerva. The younger Laenas married Rubellia Bassa, the daughter of his maternal cousin Gaius Rubellius Blandus, suffect consul in 18. That Blandus was married, either before or after the birth of Rubellia, to Julia Livia, great-granddaughter of the emperor Tiberius, which aligned Laenas with the ruling Julio-Claudian dynasty.

Together Laenas and Rubellia Bassa are known to have at least one child, a surmised son, who was the grandfather of Sergius Octavius Laenas Pontianus, consul in 131.

References 

1st-century Romans
Laenas, Gaius
Suffect consuls of Imperial Rome